Manolis Koukoulas (alternate spellings: Emmanouil) ((born August 19, 1991) is a Greek professional basketball player. He is 2.10 m (6' 10") tall. He plays at the center position.

Professional career
Some of the clubs that Koukoulas has played with in his pro career include: Ilysiakos, Kolossos Rodou, Panionios, Básquet Coruña and Aries Trikala.

National team career
Koukoulas was a member of the junior national teams of Greece. With Greece's junior national teams, he played at the 2007 FIBA Europe Under-16 Championship, the 2009 FIBA Europe Under-18 Championship, and the 2011 FIBA Europe Under-20 Championship.

References

External links
FIBA Profile
Basketball-Reference.com Profile
DraftExpress.com Profile
Eurobasket.com Profile
Greek Basket League Profile 

1991 births
Living people
Aries Trikala B.C. players
Básquet Coruña players
Centers (basketball)
Doukas B.C. players
Greek Basket League players
Greek men's basketball players
Ilysiakos B.C. players
Kolossos Rodou B.C. players
Kymis B.C. players
Maroussi B.C. players
Panionios B.C. players
Basketball players from Athens